Won-Sik Yang (April 18, 1936) is a  South Korean orthodontist who is known for his contributions in establishing the Korean Association of Orthodontists (KAO).  He served as the first editor-in-chief for the Korean Journal of Orthodontics (KJO) in 1970.

Life
He was born in Kaesong in 1936. He attended Seoul National University for his college, dental and orthodontic education. He also received his Ph.D. from Seoul University. Yang played an important role in establishing the Korean Association of Orthodontists. He served as the President of KAO in 1980. Yang was also the first editor-in-chief for the KJO in 1970. During his tenure, the KJO was published twice a year. In 1995, he was elected to the board of trustees of KAO and served as the committee director of the Korean Board of Orthodontics. In 1996, 51 orthodontists were approved as board certified.

Positions
 1970 - Founding editor-in-chief of Korean Journal of Orthodontics
 1980–1982 - Founding president, Korean Association of Orthodontists
 1988–1990 - President, Korean Division, International Association of Dental Research
 1986–1994 - Director, Department of orthodontics, Dental Hospital, Seoul National University
 1995–1998 - Chairman of Council, Korean Association of Orthodontists

Awards
 Grand Science Award, Korean Dental Association, 2000
 Jade Stripes Order of Service Merit, 2001
 Professor emeritus, Seoul National University, 2001

References

1936 births
2014 deaths
Orthodontists
Seoul National University alumni
Academic staff of Seoul National University
South Korean dentists
20th-century dentists
People from Kaesong